Belinda Jo Carlisle (born August 17, 1958) is an American singer. She gained fame as the lead vocalist of the Go-Go's, the most successful all-female rock band of all time, and went on to have a prolific career as a solo artist.

Raised in Southern California, Carlisle became the lead vocalist of the Go-Go's after the band's formation in 1978. With their chart-topping debut studio album Beauty and the Beat in 1981, the group helped popularize new wave music in the United States. The Go-Go's were the first (and to date only) all-female band in history who wrote their own songs and played their own instruments to achieve a No. 1 album. The Go-Go's have sold over seven million records worldwide.

After the break-up of the Go-Go's in 1985, Carlisle went on to have a successful solo career with radio hits such as "Mad About You", "I Get Weak", "Circle in the Sand", "Leave a Light On", and "Heaven Is a Place on Earth". The Go-Go's reformed in 1999, and Carlisle continues to perform with them regularly while also maintaining her solo career.

Carlisle's autobiography, Lips Unsealed, published in June 2010, was a New York Times Best Seller and received favorable reviews. In 2011, Carlisle, as a member of the Go-Go's, received a star on the Hollywood Walk of Fame. She and the band were inducted into the Rock and Roll Hall of Fame in 2021.

Early life and education

Belinda Jo Carlisle was born in Hollywood, Los Angeles, California, on August 17, 1958 to Harold Carlisle, a gas station employee, and his wife, Joanne (née Thompson), a homemaker. Her mother met her father, who was 20 years her senior, at age 18, and Carlisle was born nine months later. She was named after her mother's favorite film, Johnny Belinda (1948). She is of Irish and Native American descent. Carlisle was the first of seven siblings; she has three brothers and three sisters. When she was five years old, Carlisle's father abandoned their family, and she has stated that she spent most of her childhood impoverished. As a teenager, she recalled owning "like, two outfits." According to Carlisle, her mother was very religious, while her father was not. In an interview with Slash magazine, she described herself as a reject from a Southern Baptist household.

Her mother later remarried Walt Kurczeski, who Carlisle says was an alcoholic, and with whom she had a tumultuous relationship. She took on his last name during her high school years. The family moved frequently during her childhood, from Simi Valley to Reseda, before settling in Burbank when Carlisle was seven years old. At age ten, Carlisle began to express interest in music, and recalled the Beach Boys, Cat Stevens, the Stylistics, and the Animals as being early musical influences.

The family relocated again during Carlisle's adolescence, this time to Thousand Oaks, California; she attended Colina Junior High School in Thousand Oaks, where she was a 3rd-string guard on the boys' basketball team, and later Newbury Park High School, where she was a cheerleader. During her teenage years, Carlisle became rebellious: "By the time I hit fourteen, I'd gone really wild," she said. "I ran away from home, smoked pot, dropped acid ... you name it, I'd try it." After high school, Carlisle worked at a House of Fabrics store, and as a photocopier clerk at the Hilton Hotels Corporation in Los Angeles at age 18. She took night classes attending beauty college, but dropped out in the first year. At the age of 19, Carlisle left home to pursue a career in music.

Career

Early ventures and the Go-Go's

Carlisle's first venture into music was in 1977 as drummer for the punk rock band the Germs, under the name Dottie Danger. She was recruited into the band by Lorna Doom, whom she had met in an art class while a student at Newbury Park High School. However, her time in the band was short owing to her contracting mononucleosis, and she never recorded or performed live with the Germs. According to Germs guitarist Pat Smear, upon quitting, she introduced her friend, Donna Rhia, who became her replacement. Carlisle does appear on one recording introducing the band at a 1977 performance at the Whisky a Go Go, heard on the live album Germicide (1977). Around this time, Carlisle provided some backing vocals for Black Randy and the Metrosquad.

Soon after leaving the Germs, she co-founded the Go-Go's (originally named the Misfits) with friends and fellow musicians Margot Olavarria, Elissa Bello, and Jane Wiedlin. Olavarria and Bello were soon out of the group, and the new line-up included Carlisle, Wiedlin, bassist-turned-guitarist Charlotte Caffey, guitarist-turned-bassist Kathy Valentine, and drummer Gina Schock. All five women were largely untrained musicians, and Carlisle recalls having to use tape as fret markers during their initial songwriting: "[Charlotte] had to show us how to plug in our amps," she said.

The Go-Go's went on to become one of the most successful American bands of the 1980s, helping usher new wave music into popular American radio, and becoming the first and only all-female band that wrote their own music and played their own instruments to ever achieve a No. 1 album, Beauty and the Beat (1981), which featured the hits "We Got the Beat" and "Our Lips Are Sealed". The Go-Go's recorded two more studio albums on I.R.S. Records, including 1982's Vacation, which went gold. "Head over Heels", from their 1984 album Talk Show, made it to No. 11.

In 1984, Carlisle made a foray into acting in the movie Swing Shift, appearing as a band singer alongside Goldie Hawn and Kurt Russell.

Solo career

1985–1990
The Go-Go's broke up in 1985, and Carlisle embarked on a solo career. Carlisle's debut solo studio album Belinda was released in 1986, also on I.R.S. Records. This album was successful in North America and was certified Gold in the United States and Platinum in Canada. Her summer hit "Mad About You" peaked at No. 3 in the United States, topped the Canadian Singles Chart, and charted in the top 10 in Australia. "Mad About You" was followed by the Motown-influenced single "I Feel the Magic" written by Charlotte Caffey, and by a cover version of the Freda Payne song "Band of Gold". All three songs were included on her debut studio album. The single "Since You've Gone", co-written by Lindsey Buckingham of Fleetwood Mac, was used only for promotion. Susanna Hoffs co-wrote the single "I Need a Disguise" in which she also sang backing vocals along with Jane Wiedlin. Duran Duran's Andy Taylor played guitar on some album tracks and appeared in her "Mad About You" music video.

During this time, Carlisle also had songs featured on movie soundtracks, notably "In My Wildest Dreams" from the movie Mannequin (1987), "Shot in the Dark" from the Anthony Michael Hall thriller Out of Bounds (1986), as well as "Dancing in the City" from the Whoopi Goldberg movie Burglar (1987).

The musical style of 1987's Heaven on Earth eschewed the 1960s-influenced pop of Carlisle's debut studio album in favor of slickly produced 1980s power pop. It was released in the United States through MCA, and in the United Kingdom through Virgin Records. The album became a Top 5 bestseller in the UK and Australia, and was nominated for a Grammy Award.

The album's first single, "Heaven Is a Place on Earth", topped the single charts in the United States and the UK, with the dance mix of the song also topping the Billboard dance chart in the United States. The promotional video was directed by Academy Award-winning American actress Diane Keaton. The second single from the album was the Diane Warren-penned "I Get Weak", which peaked at No. 2 in the United States and No. 10 in the UK. The third single from the album was "Circle in the Sand", another Top 10 hit in the United States, the UK, and Germany. "World Without You" was another British hit. Following the success of the album, Carlisle embarked on the Good Heavens world tour, which sold out Wembley Arena in London.

Carlisle's follow-up to the success of Heaven on Earth was Runaway Horses, released on October 23, 1989. The album hit the Top 5 in both Australia and the UK, certified double platinum in Australia and platinum in the UK and in Canada. The first release, "Leave a Light On", peaked at No. 11 in the United States, and became another Top 5 smash in the UK, Australia and Canada.

1989 also saw Carlisle performing co-lead vocals with the Smithereens in a duet with the band's lead vocalist Pat DiNizio on the song "Blue Period". The song was featured on their third studio album 11.

The second United States single, "Summer Rain", reached No. 30 in early 1990. The song reached No. 6 in Australia. It was the final release from Runaway Horses in the UK where it was released as the album's sixth single in December 1990, peaking at No. 23 in January 1991. Three further singles were released: the title track; "La Luna", which reached the Top 10 in Switzerland and Top 20 hit in Germany and Australia; and "(We Want) The Same Thing", which reached No. 6 in the UK.

In the late autumn of 1990, the Go-Go's reunited for a tour to support their first greatest hits album, Greatest, including a new recording of the cover song "Cool Jerk" (The Go-Go's original cover was featured on their 1980 European EP, with a second version being released in 1982). A notable feature of the tour was an anti-fur campaign, where the band members supported the animal rights organization PETA.

1991–1999
In 1991, Carlisle released her fourth solo studio album, Live Your Life Be Free. The album marked somewhat of a return to 1960s-influenced music for Carlisle and included songs mainly written and produced by Rick Nowels but also two songs co-written by Carlisle. The single "Do You Feel Like I Feel?" was accompanied by a music video inspired by the B movie Attack of the 50 Foot Woman (1958). The title track, "Live Your Life Be Free", released as first single outside the United States, was a Top 20 hit single in many countries reaching No. 12 in the UK and No. 13 in Australia. Subsequent releases "Half the World" and "Little Black Book" (co-written by Marcella Detroit under her real name Marcy Levy) were also hits outside the United States. The album was also a success in Europe (Top 10 in the UK and Gold certification). To date, "Do You Feel Like I Feel?" is Carlisle's final single to enter in the Billboard Hot 100 chart, peaking at No. 73.

Still active in Europe and Australia with a recording contract at Virgin Records, her 1992 greatest hits album The Best of Belinda, Volume 1 reached No. 1, and was certified double platinum in the UK and platinum in Australia. This first greatest hits album included all the hits taken from Heaven on Earth, Runaway Horses, and Live Your Life Be Free. The United States version of the album was named Her Greatest Hits and also included songs from her debut studio album Belinda.

Carlisle's fifth solo studio album, Real, was released in 1993 on the Virgin label in the United States and in Europe. Produced without Nowels, the album was a departure from Carlisle's polished pop music formula. Even the album's cover photograph featured her with little or no make-up. Carlisle co-produced and co-wrote much of the album, collaborating heavily with friend and ex-Go-Go member Charlotte Caffey. The album was Carlisle's fifth consecutive to reach the UK Top 10 peaking at number 9. It peaked also at number 23 in Sweden. Its lead single, "Big Scary Animal", peaked at No. 12 in the UK. The second single from Real was "Lay Down Your Arms", which made the Top 30 in the UK. Gregg Alexander of the New Radicals co-wrote the single "Here Comes My Baby". Also in 1993, Carlisle provided guest vocals on the Lemonheads sixth studio album Come on Feel the Lemonheads.

The Go-Go's reunited in 1994 to support the retrospective double-CD Return to the Valley of The Go-Go's, their second collection, which featured three new songs, including the single "The Whole World Lost Its Head". However, the band broke up again, soon after the promotional tour.

Carlisle returned to the recording studio, and resumed working again with Rick Nowels. In 1996 she released in the UK and Australia her sixth solo studio album, A Woman & a Man, on the Chrysalis label. This album, consisting of mostly relaxed adult pop, revitalized her solo career in Europe, and included several hits. The leadoff single, "In Too Deep", returned Carlisle to the UK Top 10 for the first time in six years, reaching No. 6. "Always Breaking My Heart", written and produced by Per Gessle of Roxette, also made the UK Top 10, peaking at No. 8.

The album spawned two further hits in the UK: "Love in the Key of C", and "California", which featured arrangement and backing vocals by Brian Wilson of the Beach Boys. The album reached No. 12 in the UK, and was certified gold. As a result of A Woman & a Mans UK success, the album was released in the United States during the summer of 1997 on the small Ark21 label. In 1997, she recorded "I Won't Say (I'm in Love)" for the Disney movie Hercules. The song was released as a single exclusively in France and Germany.

In 1999, Carlisle released a greatest hits album in the UK, a double-disc on the Virgin label, collectively titled A Place on Earth: The Greatest Hits. The first disc featured Carlisle's hits plus three new tracks recorded for the album: the single "All God's Children", and the songs "A Prayer for Everyone" and "Feels Like I've Known You Forever". The second disc, subtitled A Place on Earth, contained previously released remixes of some of her hits and some B-sides which had not previously been released on CD. Some of the remixes were by William Orbit. A Place on Earth: The Greatest Hits was certified Gold in the UK and went on to sell in excess of one million copies worldwide. A European version was marketed with an interview CD in which Carlisle provides answers to over 40 questions sent in by fans.

Later recordings and Go-Go's reunions

2001–2009

In 2001, the Go-Go's reunited again and released a studio album of new material, God Bless the Go-Go's. Green Day's lead vocalist Billie Joe Armstrong co-wrote the only released single "Unforgiven".

God Bless the Go-Go's received mixed reviews from critics. Peter Fawthrop of AllMusic wrote "Every bit as Go-Go's, that is, as their non-hits and less remarkable material. While the Go-Go's sound is intact, there is not a "We Got the Beat" or a "Head Over Heels" to be found. It is feasible that in this age of pop rebirth, the Go-Go's decided it was now or never ... The album doesn't attempt to update the band's sound with hip-hop moves or electronic frippery, for which God should bless 'em, indeed. The girls' hold on the current pop world remains so strong that Green Day's Billie Joe Armstrong co-writes a song ("Unforgiven") in impeccable Go-Go's drag".

In spite of the mixed reviews, the album charted in the US Billboard 200, peaking at number No. 57. Around the time of the Go-Go's definitive reunion tour, Carlisle appeared nude for the cover feature and a full pictorial of the August 2001 edition of Playboy.

In 2007, Carlisle released her seventh album, Voila, which was her first full-length solo studio album in more than ten years. The album was produced by John Reynolds and included Brian Eno on keyboards. Consisting of a mix of French pop tunes and chanson standards, including covers of Françoise Hardy and Édith Piaf classics, Voila was released via Rykodisc in the UK on February 5 and in the United States the following day, February 6, 2007.

In early 2009, Carlisle was on the eighth season of Dancing with the Stars, paired with Jonathan Roberts. She was the first star to be eliminated from the competition, on March 17. In October 2009, Carlisle took over the role of Velma Von Tussle in London's West End production of Hairspray at the Shaftesbury Theatre. She remained with the show until late January 2010 and was replaced by Siobhán McCarthy.

2010–present

Between 2011 and 2012, Carlisle embarked on a United States tour with the Go-Go's, which included concerts at the Greek Theatre in Los Angeles in August 2011 and the Hollywood Bowl in September 2012. In March 2013, Carlisle released her first U.S. single in 17 years titled "Sun", an up-tempo pop song, which was included on ICON – The Best of Belinda Carlisle, a new greatest hits compilation album. The single was also released in the United Kingdom. The song was written by Carlisle, Jane Wiedlin of the Go-Go's and singer-songwriter Gabe Lopez. Lopez also produced the song. While the track did not chart, it received positive reviews.

In August 2013, Edsel Records released remastered, three-disc versions of Heaven on Earth, Runaway Horses, Live Your Life Be Free and Real. Each album comprised a remastered version of the original LP followed by the 7-inch or radio edits of each single from that album, a second disc of remixes and 12-inch versions of all the singles, and a DVD comprising the promotional videos for the singles. Some of singles and remixes had never previously been released on CD. In March 2014, a new Greatest Hits titled The Collection was released containing 18 hits and one new song, "Goodbye Just Go", along with a DVD of 18 videos. The album reached number 24 in the UK albums chart.

Also in March 2014, another digitally remastered, five-disc retrospective collection titled Anthology was released. The anthology included "Dancing in the City", which had previously only been available on the Japanese LP/CD for the soundtrack to the 1987 movie I Won't Say I'm in Love which had previously only been released in 1997 as a CD single in France. It also included all three singles from her debut studio album and all four singles from A Woman & a Man. Later in 2014, Carlisle's three other studio albums, Belinda, A Woman & a Man and Voila were re-issued by Edsel on CD, although there were a number of issues with their production.

Carlisle confirmed in a radio interview in August 2015 that she had completed work on a new studio album, earmarked for release in January 2016. She commented that the music on the album would be partly inspired by Kundalini yoga, which she had taken up while pregnant during 1991–1992 and of which she had qualified as a teacher since becoming sober in 2005. Also in August 2015, Edsel released a box set of all the commercially released singles from Carlisle's studio albums, plus a bonus disc featuring a previously unreleased recording of "In My Wildest Dreams", which had featured in the 1987 film Mannequin. In late 2016, the Go-Go's completed an international tour with Best Coast as a supporting act, which Carlisle stated would likely be their last tour together.

Carlisle's eighth studio album, a selection of Gurmukhi chants titled Wilder Shores, was released in September 2017.

Carlisle and the Go-Go's announced an 11-date reunion tour scheduled to begin in June 2020. However, in May 2020 the tour was postponed due to the COVID-19 pandemic.

In May 2021 it was announced that the Go-Go's would be inducted into the Rock and Roll Hall of Fame. The band performed "Vacation", "Our Lips Are Sealed", and "We Got the Beat" during the induction ceremony.

The band confirmed plans for a 2022 UK tour with Billy Idol that was supposed to start in June 2022 but was later scrapped due to Idol's health, and the Go-Go's other commitments. The band was forced to postpone a short West Coast tour scheduled for the first week of January 2022 due to a COVID-19 case involving someone on the tour. New rescheduled dates for the shows would be announced very soon.

In March 2023, Carlisle announced the release of Big Big Love, a five track EP, set for release on March 17, 2023.

Musical style and influences

Carlisle has been noted by critics for her dynamic soprano vocal range. While Carlisle's discography both with the Go-Go's and in her solo work have been predominately characterized as pop music, some music scholars such as Greil Marcus have noted a confluence of subtle punk influences as well as pop rock, specifically in the Go-Go's early releases (Marcus suggests that any traces of punk influence were carried over from Carlisle's brief tenure in the Germs).

Carlisle has been alternately described by critics as a "punk diva" and "pop princess". As a singer in the Go-Go's, Carlisle was associated with the new wave genre, and the band was remarked by critics for their style that "inject[ed] punk with the sound of California surf music." Her subsequent solo releases, beginning with her self-titled solo debut, Belinda (1986), were remarked by critics as more polished contemporary pop music.

Her early inspirations during her childhood were the Beach Boys, Cat Stevens, the Stylistics, and the Animals. As a teenager, she saw Iggy Pop on the cover of the Stooges' Raw Power (1973) in a record store, an album which she credited as a gateway exposing her to punk and art rock acts such as the Velvet Underground, New York Dolls, Roxy Music, and the Sex Pistols. In a 2013 interview, Carlisle stated that despite having recorded an abundance of it throughout her career, she "didn't really listen to pop music", and had recently been inspired by jazz artists such as Miles Davis.

Personal life

Relationships and family

Carlisle had a two-year relationship with Bill Bateman, drummer for the Blasters, in the early 1980s. She broke up abruptly with Bateman because she had taken up with Mike Marshall of the Los Angeles Dodgers. Her cocaine use was a negative influence on these relationships.

In 1986, Carlisle married political operative and film producer Morgan Mason, son of actor James Mason and actress Pamela Mason. He made appearances in Carlisle's music videos "Mad About You" and "Heaven Is a Place on Earth". They have one son, James Duke Mason, who was born in 1992. After the 1994 Northridge earthquake, Carlisle and her family moved to Fréjus in south-eastern France. They lived between there and the U.S. In 2017, the couple moved to Bangkok, Thailand.

In a 1990 interview with Spin, Carlisle stated that she was not close with her siblings or parents, saying: "I want to be close to them. I kind of feel uncomfortable. I think I feel guilty sometimes about my success in some ways."

Health
During the initial stages of her tenure with the Go-Go's, Carlisle developed a serious addiction to cocaine and alcohol that went on to span 30 years. Simultaneously, she had also developed an eating disorder, which she said stemmed from media comments regarding her appearance; her excessive cocaine use helped keep her weight down. Additionally, Carlisle admitted to using LSD, quaaludes, and MDA regularly as both a teenager and adult. In a 2017 interview, she told The Guardian that she "couldn't believe [she wasn't] dead".

In 2005, at the height of her drug abuse, Carlisle spent three days isolated in a London hotel room binging cocaine. At one point, she recalled that she looked at herself in the mirror and was alarmed that she "didn't see a light or a soul" in her eyes. "I sat in my room and did [cocaine] all evening. Between lines [of cocaine], I smoked cigarettes, played games on my laptop, and paced the room. I must have smoked ten packs of cigarettes in two days." On the third day, Carlisle said she had a vision of herself being found dead in a hotel, accompanied by an auditory hallucination in which a loud voice informed her: "You are going to die here if you carry on like this." The incident jarred Carlisle into seeking sobriety, and she says she has been sober since 2005.

She told The Sydney Morning Herald in 2014: "I don't smoke anymore, I don't drink any more and I don't do drugs any more. I am very much into my Buddhism. I found turning 40 [in 1998] a real passage in time for me." Carlisle states in her autobiography Lips Unsealed: A Memoir (2010) that she has practiced Nichiren Buddhism as a member of the Soka Gakkai International since 2002, and she often mentions in press interviews that she chants Namu Myōhō Renge Kyō daily. She has also credited the practice with helping her maintain sobriety.

Activism
Carlisle supports LGBT rights, which she made public after her son, Duke, came out to her at age fourteen.

In 2014, Carlisle co-founded Animal People Alliance, a nonprofit organization based in Calcutta, India, that raises funds and trains and employs impoverished women to care for street animals. "We are teaching people that animals have feelings," says Carlisle. "How to recognize a street animal in distress. There is a middle class developing and they still don't have proper vet care, so a lot of what we do will be educational. We're partnering with a hospital in Calcutta to teach about adoption and to get access to emergency rooms."

In popular culture
In 1999, Carlisle was ranked No. 76 with the Go-Go's in VH1's 100 Greatest Women of Rock & Roll. In 2018, a series of Progressive commercials paid homage to her song "Heaven Is a Place on Earth". In 2016, "Heaven Is a Place on Earth" was the theme song of "San Junipero", an LGBT-themed episode of the Netflix anthology series Black Mirror, which was set in the late 1980s. In 2020, "Heaven Is a Place on Earth" was the song featured in Season 5, Episode 4 of the CW's Legends of Tomorrow, "Slay Anything", which was also set in the late 1980s, and featured both straight and LGBT characters in a high school prom setting, which had a happy ending.

Awards and nominations
Billboard Music Awards

!Ref.
|-
| rowspan=6|1986
| rowspan=4|Herself
| Top Billboard 200 Artist
|
| rowspan=6|
|-
| Top Billboard 200 Artist – Female
| 
|-
| Top Hot 100 Artist
| 
|-
| Top Hot 100 Artist – Female
| 
|-
| Belinda
| Top Billboard 200 Album
| 
|-
| "Mad About You"
| Top Hot 100 Song
| 
|-
| rowspan=2|1987
| rowspan=2|Herself
| Top Hot 100 Artist
| 
| rowspan=2|
|-
| Top Hot 100 Artist – Female
| 
|-
| rowspan=6|1988
| rowspan=5|Herself
| Top Female Artist
| 
| rowspan=6|
|-
| Top Hot 100 Artist – Female
| 
|-
| Top Billboard 200 Artist – Female
| 
|-
| Top Adult Contemporary Artist
| 
|-
| Top Adult Contemporary Artist – Female
| 
|-
| "Heaven Is a Place on Earth"
| Top Hot 100 Song
| 

Other Awards
{| class=wikitable
|-
! Year !! Awards !! Work !! Category !! Result
|-
| rowspan=2|1986
| rowspan=2|American Music Awards
| Herself
| Favorite Female Pop/Rock Video Artist 
| 
|-
| "Mad About You"
| Favorite Pop/Rock Video 
| 
|-
| rowspan=3|1988
| rowspan=2|Smash Hits Poll Winners Party
| rowspan=2| Herself
| Best Female Solo Singer 
| 
|-
| Worst Female Solo Singer 
| 
|-
| Grammy Awards
| "Heaven Is a Place on Earth"
| Best Female Pop Vocal Performance
| 
|-
| 1989
| Brit Awards
| Herself
| International Breakthrough Act
|
|-
| 1996
| Smash Hits Poll Winners Party
| Herself
| Best Female Singer
| 
|-
| 2016
| Independent Music Awards
| "California Blues" (ft. Gabe Lopez)
| Best Pop Single
| 
|-
| 2018 
| Music Week Awards
| Herself
| Catalogue Marketing Champaign
|

Discography

Studio albums
 Belinda (1986)
 Heaven on Earth (1987)
 Runaway Horses (1989)
 Live Your Life Be Free (1991)
 Real (1993)
 A Woman & a Man (1996)
 Voila (2007)
 Wilder Shores (2017)

See also
List of artists who reached number one in the United States
List of artists who reached number one on the UK Singles Chart
List of artists who reached number one in Ireland
List of number-one singles of 1986 (Canada)

References

Sources

External links

Official Facebook page
Official Go-Go's website

1958 births
Living people
American animal rights activists
American autobiographers
American Buddhists
American emigrants to France
American expatriates in Thailand
American women pop singers
American women rock singers
American new wave musicians
American sopranos
California Democrats
Converts to Buddhism from Protestantism
Converts to Sōka Gakkai
Women new wave singers
Former Baptists
Germs (band) members
The Go-Go's members
I.R.S. Records artists
American LGBT rights activists
MCA Records artists
Members of Sōka Gakkai
Nichiren Buddhists
People from Hollywood, Los Angeles
People from Newbury Park, California
People from Thousand Oaks, California
Pop punk singers
Rykodisc artists
Singers from Los Angeles
Virgin Records artists
20th-century American drummers
20th-century Baptists
21st-century Baptists
21st-century Buddhists
20th-century American singers
21st-century American singers
20th-century American women singers
21st-century American women singers
James Mason family
Women punk rock singers
Women in punk